Harry Hayes or Hays may refer to:

Harry T. Hays (1820–1876), American army officer
Harry Hays (1909–1982), Canadian politician
Juan Enrique Hayes (1891–1976), Argentine footballer
Enrique Ricardo Hayes, Argentine footballer and son of Juan Enrique Hayes

See also
Harry Hay (1912–2002), English-born American labor advocate
Henry Hayes (disambiguation)
Henry Hays (disambiguation)
Harold Hayes (1926–1989), editor
Harold Hays (born 1939), former American football linebacker